Montgomery County is a county located in the U.S. state of Illinois. According to the 2010 census, it had a population of 30,104. Its county seat is Hillsboro.

History
Montgomery County was formed in 1821 out of Bond and Madison counties. It was named in honor of Richard Montgomery, an American Revolutionary War general killed in 1775 while attempting to capture Quebec City, Canada. Perrin's 1882 History of Montgomery County relates that the county was named in honor of Gen. Montgomery, but goes on to say that "others are dubious as to whence it received its name."

Geography

Climate and weather

Adjacent counties 
 Sangamon County - north
 Christian County - northeast
 Shelby County - east
 Fayette County - southeast
 Bond County - south
 Madison County - southwest
 Macoupin County - west

Transportation

Major highways
  Interstate 55
  Illinois Route 16
  Illinois Route 48
  Illinois Route 108
  Illinois Route 127
  Illinois Route 185

Airports
Litchfield Municipal Airport is located in Montgomery County, two nautical miles (3.7 km) southwest of the central business district of Litchfield, Illinois.

Demographics

As of the 2010 United States Census, there were 30,104 people, 11,652 households, and 7,806 families living in the county. The racial makeup of the county was 95.1% white, 3.2% black or African American, 0.4% Asian, 0.2% American Indian, 0.5% from other races, and 0.7% from two or more races. Those of Hispanic or Latino origin made up 1.5% of the population. In terms of ancestry, 27.8% were German, 11.2% were Irish, 10.1% were English, and 9.8% were American.

Of the 11,652 households, 29.8% had children under the age of 18 living with them, 51.7% were married couples living together, 10.2% had a female householder with no husband present, 33.0% were non-families, and 28.4% of all households were made up of individuals. The average household size was 2.38 and the average family size was 2.87. The median age was 41.9 years.

The median income for a household in the county was $40,864 and the median income for a family was $56,945. Males had a median income of $40,749 versus $29,426 for females. The per capita income for the county was $21,700. About 10.9% of families and 14.0% of the population were below the poverty line, including 22.7% of those under age 18 and 7.4% of those age 65 or over.

Communities

Cities
 Coffeen
 Hillsboro
 Litchfield
 Nokomis
 Witt

Villages

 Butler
 Coalton
 Donnellson
 Farmersville
 Fillmore
 Harvel
 Irving
 Ohlman
 Panama
 Raymond
 Schram City
 Taylor Springs
 Waggoner
 Walshville
 Wenonah

Unincorporated communities
 Chapman
 Honey Bend
 Van Burensburg
 Zanesville
 Zenobia

Townships

 Audubon Township
 Bois D'Arc Township
 Butler Grove Township
 East Fork Township
 Fillmore Township
 Grisham Township
 Harvel Township
 Hillsboro Township
 Irving Township
 Nokomis Township
 North Litchfield Township
 Pitman Township
 Raymond Township
 Rountree Township
 South Litchfield Township
 Walshville Township
 Witt Township
 Zanesville Township

Former Townships
 South Fillmore Township

Notable people
 Donald T. Barry, nurse, businessman, and politician
Avery Bourne, member of the Illinois House of Representatives
Buddy Cole, jazz musician and composer
Mortimer A. Cullen, politician in New York
Harry Forrester, basketball and baseball coach
Otto Funk (1868–1934), violinist
John A. Graham, member of the Illinois Senate
Glen Hobbie, baseball player
Matt Hughes, UFC fighter
Calvin Hultman, member of the Iowa House of Representatives
Harold Osborn, track athlete
Ray Richmond, baseball pitcher
Red Ruffing, baseball player
Walter Short, military officer

Politics

See also
 National Register of Historic Places listings in Montgomery County, Illinois

References

External links
 
 Historical Society of Montgomery County Illinois

 
Illinois counties
1821 establishments in Illinois
Populated places established in 1821